Robert Clifford (died 1423) was an English politician.

Life
Clifford was the son of Sir John Clifford of Ellingham, Northumberland and the brother of Richard Clifford, Bishop of Worcester and London.

His first wife was a widow, Jacqueline (or Jacoba) Emelden, the coheiress of the MP Richard Emelden. She died in 1391. Little is recorded about his second wife, Joan.

Career
Clifford was Member of Parliament for Northumberland May 1382 and October 1382 and for Kent 1401, 1406 and November 1414. He was appointed High Sheriff of Northumberland for 1383 and High Sheriff of Kent for 1400 and 1415 (representing Kent as MP at the same time).

Death
Clifford died in 1423, and was buried in the nave of Canterbury Cathedral.

References

People from Northumberland
People from Kent
High Sheriffs of Kent
High Sheriffs of Northumberland
14th-century births
Year of birth missing
1423 deaths
English MPs May 1382
English MPs October 1382
English MPs 1401
English MPs 1406
English MPs November 1414
14th-century English politicians
15th-century English politicians